Alkalihalobacillus algicola is a Gram-positive, spore-forming, aerobic and motile bacterium from the genus of Alkalihalobacillus which has been isolated from the alga Fucus evanescens.

References

Bacillaceae
Bacteria described in 2004